The Pilbeam MP84 is a sports prototype race car, designed, developed and built by British manufacturer Pilbeam, for sports car racing, conforming to LMP675 (later LMP2) class rules and regulations, and produced between 2003 and 2005. It is an evolution of the previous MP84.

References

Sports prototypes
Le Mans Prototypes